Hajiakbar Abdulghupur is a citizen of China, who was held in the United States Guantanamo Bay detention camps, in Cuba for many years.

The DoD estimates that Abdulghupur was born in 1973 in Ghulja, Xinjiang Uyghur Autonomous Region, China.

He was one of the 22 Uighurs held in Guantanamo for many years, even though it became clear early on that they were innocent.

He won his habeas corpus case in 2008. Judge Ricardo Urbina declared his detention unlawful and ordered for him to be set free in the United States.

In December 2013, after having been held at Guantanamo for over eleven years, Abdulghupur was transferred to Slovakia.

References

External links
From Guantánamo to the United States: The Story of the Wrongly Imprisoned Uighurs Andy Worthington October 9, 2008
Judge Ricardo Urbina’s unclassified opinion (redacted version)
MOTIONS/STATUS HEARING - UIGHURS CASES BEFORE THE HONORABLE RICARDO M. URBINA
 Human Rights First; Habeas Works: Federal Courts’ Proven Capacity to Handle Guantánamo Cases (June 2010)

Detainees of the Guantanamo Bay detention camp
Chinese extrajudicial prisoners of the United States
Uyghurs
Living people
Year of birth uncertain
1973 births